Barbara Zbrożyna (1923–1995) was a Polish sculptor, creator of figural sculptures, monuments, portraits, religious and sepulchral sculptures. Her style evolved from realism through the synthetic simplifications, expressive and metaphoric deformation, to abstraction. She was also a painter, drawer and poet. Awarded for achievements in arts by Solidarność (1984, 1989), awarded the Prize of Brat Albert Chmielowski (1986) and Prize of Polcul Foundation (1991).

Biography

Barbara Zbrożyna was born on September 1, 1923, in Lublin. She studied at the Jan Matejko Academy of Fine Arts in Kraków at Xawery Dunikowski (1945–1947) and at the Academy of Fine Arts in Warsaw at Franciszek Strynkiewicz (1947–1952). In the years of 1951–1954, she participated in reconstruction of monumental sculptures in Warsaw. In 1976, she signed the Letter of 59, an open letter signed by 66 Polish intellectuals who protested against the changes of the Constitution of the People's Republic of Poland.

She died on December 15, 1995, in Warsaw.

Works
She was a creator of sepulchral sculptures of Xawery Dunikowski (1966), Stanisław Herbst (1974), Artur Sandauer and Erna Rosenstein (1989), figural sculptures, monuments, portraits, and religious sculptures. Her most popular sculpture was the sandstone statue of a Warsaw tradeswoman on the Mariensztat marketplace in Warsaw (1949).

References
 
 
 

1923 births
1995 deaths
Artists from Lublin
Polish sculptors
20th-century Polish painters
Polish women poets
Academy of Fine Arts in Warsaw alumni
20th-century Polish poets
20th-century sculptors
20th-century Polish women writers